The 1974–75 Kentucky Wildcats men's basketball team represented the University of Kentucky and was the 1975 NCAA runner-up. The head coach was Joe B. Hall. The team was a member of the Southeast Conference and played their home games at Rupp Arena.

Regular season
On December 7, 1974, Indiana and Kentucky met in the regular season in Bloomington with a 98-74 Indiana win. Near the end of the game, Indiana coach Bob Knight went to the Kentucky bench where the official was standing to complain about a call. Before he left, Knight hit Kentucky coach Joe B. Hall in the back of the head. UK's assistant coach Leonard Hamilton, a former FBI agent who was about 6 feet 5 inches, had to be restrained by Hall from hitting Knight. Hall later said, "It publicly humiliated me."

Knight said the slap to the head was something he has done, "affectionately" to his own players for years. "But maybe someone would not like that," he said. "If Joe didn't like it, I offer an apology. I don't apologize for the intent." ... "Hall and I have been friends for a long time," Knight said. "If he wants to dissolve the friendship, that's up to him." Knight blamed the furor on Hall, noting in his inimitable style, "If it was meant to be malicious, I'd have blasted the fucker into the seats." Indiana finished the regular season unbeaten (31-0).

NCAA tournament
Following the contentious regular season game, Indiana and Kentucky met in the 1975 NCAA Mideast Regional Final in Dayton, Ohio. Coming into that game, the Hoosiers were on a 34-game winning streak, and the number one ranked team in America. Kentucky was ranked number five. However, Indiana had lost star player Scott May to a broken arm in the regular season finale against Purdue. May scored 25 points in the regular season IU-UK meeting, but he managed only 2 points in seven minutes in the Tournament game, which he played with a cast on his left arm that limited him to 7 minutes. IU surged out to an early seven-point lead before UK rallied to tie it at 44 by halftime. Despite Indiana's Kent Benson scoring 33 points (on 13-of-18 shooting) and grabbing 23 rebounds, Kentucky would win by just two points, 92-90. The game made USA Today's list of the greatest NCAA tournament games of all time.

The loss for Indiana prevented what could have been back-to-back undefeated seasons and national championships as the Hoosiers went on to take the national title in 1976. Bob Knight would later said that this 1974-1975 team was the best he ever coached, even better than the undefeated national champions of 1976. The win put UK in the Final Four in San Diego, where they dropped the NCAA title game in what would be John Wooden's last game.

East
Kentucky 76, Marquette 54
Kentucky 90, Central Michigan 73
Kentucky 92, Indiana 90
Final Four
Kentucky 95, Syracuse 79
UCLA 92, Kentucky 85

Awards and honors

Team players drafted into the NBA

References

Kentucky Wildcats
Kentucky Wildcats men's basketball seasons
NCAA Division I men's basketball tournament Final Four seasons
Kentucky
Kentucky Wildcats
Kentucky Wildcats